In enzymology, a [cytochrome c]-lysine N-methyltransferase is an enzyme that catalyzes the chemical reaction

S-adenosyl-L-methionine + [cytochrome c]-L-lysine  S-adenosyl-L-homocysteine + [cytochrome c]-N-methyl-L-lysine

Thus, the two substrates of this enzyme are S-adenosyl methionine and cytochrome c-L-lysine, whereas its two products are S-adenosylhomocysteine and cytochrome c-N6-methyl-L-lysine.

This enzyme belongs to the family of transferases, specifically those transferring one-carbon group methyltransferases.  The systematic name of this enzyme class is S-adenosyl-L-methionine:[cytochrome c]-L-lysine N6-methyltransferase. Other names in common use include cytochrome c (lysine) methyltransferase, cytochrome c methyltransferase, cytochrome c-specific protein methylase III, cytochrome c-specific protein-lysine methyltransferase, S-adenosyl-L-methionine:[cytochrome c]-L-lysine, and 6-N-methyltransferase.  This enzyme participates in lysine degradation.

References

 
 
 

EC 2.1.1
Enzymes of unknown structure